The Bréguet 690 and its derivatives were a series of light twin-engine ground-attack aircraft that were used by the French Air Force in World War II.

The aircraft was intended to be easy to maintain, forgiving to fly, and capable of 480 km/h (300 mph) at 4,000 m (13,120 ft). The type's sturdy construction was frequently demonstrated and the armament was effective. However, French rearmament began two full years later than that in Britain, and none of these aircraft were available in sufficient numbers to make a difference in 1940.

Design and development
The 690 had begun life in 1934 as Bréguet's response to the same strategic fighter aircraft specification as the eventual winner, the Potez 630. Both were twin-engine monoplanes with twin tailplanes, powered by Hispano-Suiza 14AB radial engines of contemporary design and performance. Bréguet considered the weight limits of the specification – requiring a twin-engine, three-man aircraft to be lighter than 3,000 kg/6,600 lb (later 3,500 kg/7,700 lb) – to be overly restrictive and ignored them. Instead, the design was advertised as particularly versatile, with reconnaissance, ground attack and level bombing derivatives proposed that required no structural changes. Unsurprisingly, Bréguet lost out in the competition to Potez, but confident in the 690's potential, nevertheless began building a prototype on its own funds.

Although it had kept informed about foreign developments with dive bombers in the early 1930s, the French Air Force did not decide to acquire modern ground-attack aircraft before 1937. Engineless for nearly a year, the 690-01 prototype finally flew on 23 March 1938, and displayed such promise that 100 two-seat attack bomber versions known as the Bréguet 691 AB2 were ordered in June 1938, an order which was eventually doubled. For ground-attack, the 691's equipment included a 20 mm cannon and a pair of 7.5 mm (.295 in) machine guns firing forward, as well as an internal bomb rack that could be used in a shallow dive attack and was typically loaded with eight 50 kg (110 lb) bombs. Rear defense was provided by one flexible 7.5 mm (.295 in) machine gun, while a fixed, rearward-firing weapon of the same type was fitted under the fuselage to discourage low-flying fighters or ground fire from behind. A set of armour plates protected the crew, and the fuel tanks had rudimentary self-sealing capacity, but this protection proved insufficient in combat.

Production
Bréguet established an assembly line with remarkable speed: the first production aircraft flew less than a year after being ordered and was in service before the end of 1939. As with the Potez 630, the Bre 691 was beset with engine difficulties. Hispano-Suiza had decided to concentrate on its V12 liquid-cooled engines and the 14AB engine was unreliable. The French authorities decided to limit the Bréguet 691's production run to 78 aircraft, instead of 100. Instead, orders were placed for another version, the Bre 693 powered by Gnome-Rhône 14M radials. Apart from the changed engines, which were of slightly smaller diameter, the two types were virtually identical. Orders for the Bre 691 were switched to the new type and more than 120 of the latter had been completed by the time of France's defeat. Late production versions of the Bre 693 introduced propulsive exhaust pipes that improved top speed by a small margin as well as, according to some sources, a pair of additional machine guns in the rear of each engine nacelle. Belgium ordered 32 licence-built copies but none were completed before the Belgian collapse. French engine makers had even greater difficulties than airframe manufacturers in keeping up with the frantic demands from 1938, and in 1939 the French government decided that all combat aircraft had to be adapted for British and US engines. Fewer than 250 Bréguet 690 series aircraft were completed. The Armée de l'air received only 211 examples: 78 Bre.691s, 124 Bre.693s and nine Bre.695s but the Germans captured several complete or near-complete aircraft at the factories.

Operational history
A small experimental unit had been experimenting with ground-attack tactics since 1937, initially in outdated biplanes such as the Potez 25, then in ANF Les Mureaux 115 monoplanes. Eventually, the Armée de l’Air concluded that low-altitude level bombing was more suitable than dive-bombing for engaging enemy vehicles and artillery over the battlefield. The chosen tactic consisted in a nap-of-the-earth approach at maximum speed, followed by a strafing run or the delivery of time-delayed bombs directly over the target. French commanders widely considered this tactic as safe for the attackers, as anti-aircraft weapons then in service would be inefficient. The French Army was not using anti-aircraft autocannons at the time (the 25 mm Hotchkiss and 20 mm Oerlikon cannons were issued only later), relying instead on rifle-calibre machine guns and slow-firing 75 mm (2.95 in) guns.

In late 1939, two squadrons transferred from level bomber units were gathered in the small airfield near Vinon-sur-Verdon, where they began their operational training. As Bréguet 691s were not available yet, the crews flew the Potez 633 light bomber. When they were eventually delivered, the Bréguets were popular with their crews, although the unreliable engines in the Bre 691 affected aircraft availability rates, and undercarriage failures proved especially troublesome. Only in March 1940 were the first combat-worthy Bre. 693s delivered, and there were now five squadrons to equip: GBA I/51, GBA II/51, GBA I/54, GBA II/54, and GBA II/35 (GBA stood for Groupe de bombardement d'assaut – assault bomber squadron), with a theoretical complement of 13 aircraft each.

Because of this late delivery, crews were still working up their new machines and developing tactics when the Germans attacked. On 12 May, GBAs I/54 and II/54 performed the Bréguet's first operational sorties, against German motorized columns in the Liège-Tongeren-Maastricht area. German anti-aircraft fire was so devastating that only eight of the eighteen Bre.693s returned.

The disastrous results of this first engagement forced the French commanders to reconsider their tactics. Until 15 May, GBA crews performed shallow dive attacks from higher altitude, which resulted in reduced losses, but the attacks had clearly been inaccurate, as the Bréguet lacked a bombsight. On subsequent missions, the GBAs reintroduced low-level attacks, but with smaller formations. As the position of the French and Allied armies grew steadily more desperate, the assault groups were engaged daily, still enduring losses to anti-aircraft fire, but also increasingly to German fighters.

In late June, the Armée de l'Air tried to evacuate its modern aircraft to North Africa, out of German reach, from where many hoped to continue the fight. However, the short-ranged Bréguets were not deemed able to cross the Mediterranean. Unlike other modern French types, the Bréguet 690 family saw its combat career end with the Armistice.

By this time, 104 aircraft had been lost, and a further 14 were written off in November 1940 (most of these had also been destroyed or damaged beyond repair during the campaign). Out of 205 Bréguets delivered to the Armée de l'Air, 58% were lost. The five GBAs sustained crew casualty rates of around 50%.

After the Armistice, the Vichy authorities were allowed to maintain a small air force in mainland France, and its assault bomber pilots flew rare training flights in the Bre.693 and Bre.695. After the Germans occupied all of France in late 1942, some of the survivors situated in the Italian occupation zone were transferred to Italy. However, they didn't find any use there. On the contrary, the Germans ordered the completion of several unfinished aircraft after the Armistice. These were used as advanced trainers.

Variants
Bre 690.01 Bréguet 690 prototype.
Bre 691.01 Bréguet 691 prototype.
Bre 691 Two-seat twin-engine ground-attack aircraft.
Bre 693.01 Bréguet 693 prototype.
Bre 693 Two-seat twin-engine ground-attack aircraft.
Bre 694.01 Prototype intended to be two or three-seat tactical reconnaissance aircraft.
S 10 Swedish reconnaissance variant of the export Bre 694. Would have had Swedish equipment and armament. 12 ordered but cancelled due to the war.
Bre 695.01 Bre 695 prototype.
Bre 695A conversion of a Bre 693, was not particularly successful, the larger, heavier and higher-drag Pratt & Whitney R-1535 Twin Wasp Junior engines reducing visibility and providing only a minor performance improvement at lower altitudes. Only a few 695s were operationally used before the armistice.
Bre 696.01A two-seat light bomber prototype, which was first ordered and then cancelled in favour of the Bre 693.
Bre 697Intended as a pre-prototype for the Bréguet 700 C2 heavy fighter. Powered by Gnome-Rhône 14N-48/Gnome-Rhône 14N-49 engines which offered 50% more power than the 14M, the Bre 697 prototype displayed a sensational rate of climb, and was as fast as a Bf 109E. The Bre 700 was expected to offer even higher speed and would have been very heavily armed.

Operators
None received before surrender
French Air Force
Vichy French Air Force
.: Luftwaffe
 Italian Air Force. Several aircraft captured, never brought back into service.
Swedish Air Force. None received due to the German invasion of France.

Specifications (Bre.693 AB.2)

See also

References

Notes

Bibliography
 Ehrengardt, C. J. "'Voyage au bout de l'enfer: les Bréguet au combat." Aéro-Journal, no. 28, 2002.
 
 Green, William. Aircraft of the Third Reich. London: Aerospace Publishing Limited, 2010. .
 
 Jackson, Robert. Air War Over France 1939–40.

 Ledermann, O. and J-F. Mérolle. "Le Sacrifice: Les Bréguet 693 de l'aviation d'assaut dans la Bataille de France." IPMS France, Paris, 1994.
 Notice descriptive et d'utilisation de l'avion Bréguet 691 AB2 à moteurs Hispano-Suiza, Ministère de l'Air, 1939.
 
 Taylor, John W. R. and Jean Alexander. Combat Aircraft of the World. New York: G.P. Putnam's Sons, 1969. .

 0693
1930s French bomber aircraft
French attack aircraft
Aircraft first flown in 1938
Twin piston-engined tractor aircraft